Blade II: The Soundtrack is the soundtrack to Guillermo del Toro's 2002 film Blade II. It was released on March 19, 2002 via Immortal Records, serving as a sequel to Blade: Music from and Inspired by the Motion Picture.

It features contributions by hip hop artists, such as Bubba Sparxxx, Busta Rhymes, Cypress Hill, Eve, Fabolous, Ice Cube, Jadakiss, Mos Def, Mystikal, Rah Digga, Redman, Silkk the Shocker, The Roots, Trina and Volume 10, while production was handled mainly by electronic musicians, including BT, Danny Saber, Dub Pistols, Gorillaz, Groove Armada, Fatboy Slim, Moby, Paul Oakenfold, Roni Size and The Crystal Method among others. 

The soundtrack is the third in a trilogy of genre-blending soundtracks produced by Happy Walters and released by Immortal Records. It was preceded by the soundtracks for Judgment Night (1993) and Spawn (1997).

Track listing

Charts

Weekly charts

Year-end charts

References

External links

2002 soundtrack albums
2000s film soundtrack albums
Hip hop soundtracks
Albums produced by Moby
Immortal Records albums
Techno compilation albums
Albums produced by DJ Muggs
Albums produced by Danny Saber
Marvel Comics film soundtracks
Albums produced by Neil Davidge
Albums produced by Steve Osborne
Blade (franchise)
Albums produced by Dan the Automator
Superhero film soundtracks